Rhyne Williams was the defending champion but lost in the quarterfinal to Malek Jaziri.

Johnson won the title, defeating Malek Jaziri in the final, 6–4, 6–4.

Seeds

Draw

Finals

Top half

Bottom half

References
 Main Draw
 Qualifying Draw

Challenger of Dallas - Singles
2014 Singles